Trauger is an unincorporated community and coal town in Westmoreland County, Pennsylvania, United States.

References

Unincorporated communities in Westmoreland County, Pennsylvania
Coal towns in Pennsylvania